Sala Krau is a district located in Pailin Province, western Cambodia. The district is subdivided into 4 communes and 43 villages. According to the 1998 census of Cambodia, it had a population of 7,106.

There is an official road international border crossing with Thailand in this district located at Phsar Prum. The border crossing is connected with Pailin by National Road 57. The checkpoint on the Thai side is called the Ban Pakkard Border Checkpoint (Thai: จุดผ่านแดนถาวรบ้านผักกาด), which is located in Khlong Yai village, Pong Nam Ron District in Chanthaburi Province.

References 

Districts of Pailin province
Cambodia–Thailand border crossings